Hamilton West was a federal electoral district in Ontario, Canada, that was represented in the House of Commons of Canada from 1904 to 2004.

History

The federal riding was created when the old riding of Hamilton was split in 1903.

In 1903, the city of Hamilton was divided into two electoral districts: Hamilton East and Hamilton West. Hamilton West consisted of wards 2, 3, 4, and 5 of the city. The boundaries expanded ever eastward as the population centre did, but it always included the neighbourhoods of Ainslie Wood, Westdale and downtown Hamilton.

In 1914, it was redefined to consist of the western part of the city of Hamilton described by a line drawn from the brow of the mountain along Dundurn Street, west along Aberdeen Avenue, north along Paradise Road to Cootes Paradise, along the south and east margins of the marsh to Burlington Bay, east along the bay, south along Hughson Street, east along King Street, south along Ferguson Avenue, west along Aberdeen Avenue and the Mountain Brow.

In 1924, it was redefined to consist of the part of the city of Hamilton lying west of Wellington Street, east of Paradise Road, and north of Cootes Paradise.

In 1935, it was redefined to exclude the part lying south of Concession Street, Claremont Drive and West Fifth Street.

In 1952, it was redefined to consist of the part of the city of Hamilton lying north of the brow of the mountain and west of a line drawn from north to south along Wellington Street and its prolongation south to the brow of the mountain.

In 1966, it was redefined to consist of the part of the City of Hamilton bounded as follows: commencing where Wellington Street meets the shore of Hamilton Harbour, south along Wellington Street, east along Robert Street, south along East Avenue, east along Main Street, south along Wentworth Street, west along the brow of the Mountain to the west city limit.

In 1976, it was redefined to consist of the part of the City of Hamilton lying west and north of a line drawn south along Wentworth Street from Hamilton Harbour, east along Main Street East, south along Sherman Avenue, and west along the brow of the Mountain to the city limit.

In 1987, it was redefined to consist of the part of the City of Hamilton lying west and north of a line drawn from north to south from the northern city limit, south along Wentworth Street, east along Cannon Street, south along Sherman Avenue, west along the brow of the Niagara Escarpment, to the western limit of the city.

In 1996, it was redefined to consist of the part of the City of Hamilton lying west and north of a line drawn from where westerly limit of the city meets Lisajane Court to Stone Church Road, east along Stone Church Road, north along Garth Street, east along Lincoln Alexander Expressway, north along West Fifth Street, east along the brow of the Niagara Escarpment, north to and along Wentworth Street, west along Main Street, north along Wellington Street, east along Burlington Street, and north along the spur line of the Canadian National Railway to the northern city limit.

The electoral district was abolished in 2003 when it was redistributed between Ancaster—Dundas—Flamborough—Westdale, Hamilton Centre and Hamilton Mountain ridings.

Members of Parliament

This riding elected the following members of the House of Commons of Canada:

Federal election results

On Mr. Wilton's death, 1 February 1937:

On Mr. Gibson's appointment as Puisne Judge of the Supreme Court of Ontario, 18 January 1950:

Resignation of the Hon. Lincoln M. Alexander, 27 May 1980:

External links
Federal riding history from the Library of Parliament

Former federal electoral districts of Ontario